Vara Municipality (Vara kommun) is a municipality in Västra Götaland County in western Sweden. Its seat is located in the town of Vara.

The present municipality consists of 25 original local government entities (as of 1863). Between 1974 and 1982 the territory of present Essunga Municipality was also included.

Districts
Bitterna
Edsvära
Eling
Fyrunga
Hällum
Jung
Kvänum
Larv
Laske-Vedum
Levene
Long
Längjum
Naum
Norra Vånga
Ryda
Skarstad
Slädene
Sparlösa
Södra Kedum
Södra Lundby
Tråvad
Vara
Önum
Öttum

References

External links

Vara Municipality - Official site

Municipalities of Västra Götaland County
Skaraborg